Hasan Ali-ye Kadkhodalu (also Romanized as Ḩasan ‘Alī-ye Kadkhodālū; also known as Ḩasan‘alī Kadkhodālū) is a village in Qeshlaq Rural District, Abish Ahmad District, Kaleybar County, East Azerbaijan Province, Iran. At the 2006 census, its population was 312, composed of 49 families. The village is populated by the Kurdish Chalabianlu tribe.

References 

Populated places in Kaleybar County
Kurdish settlements in East Azerbaijan Province